Rhizobium pisi is a root nodule bacterium.

References

Rhizobiaceae